John Curtis (15 March 1880 – 11 July 1962) was an Irish missionary of the Anglican Church.

He was born in Dublin on 15 March 1880, educated at Trinity College, Dublin (Trinity Master of Arts {MA Dubl}) and ordained in 1904. He was a curate at Christ Church, Leeson Park in his home city after which he joined the Dublin University Mission to Fukien; he married Eda Bryan-Brown, a fellow missionary who was also a doctor.      He was a Temporary Chaplain to the Forces in 1917-18 serving in Salonika He was Bishop of Chekiang, China, from 1929 to 1949, during which period the Nationalist, Communist and Japanese armies fought over the country. On his return to England he was made Vicar of Wilden, Stourport, and retired in 1957. The Bishop and his wife had two children. He died on 11 July 1962 and his widow on 18 January 1964. He had become a Doctor of Divinity (DD).

References

1880 births
Alumni of Trinity College Dublin
Anglican missionary bishops in China
1962 deaths
Christian clergy from Dublin (city)
20th-century Anglican bishops in China
Anglican bishops of Chekiang